Portrait of a Young Woman or Bust of a Young Woman is a 1632 oil on canvas painting by Rembrandt, signed and dated by the artist.

At the end of the 19th century it was bought by Johann II, Prince of Liechtenstein, who gave it to Georg Schmid von Grüneck, bishop of Chur, who in 1929 sold it for $125,000 to R. C. Vose Galleries, an art dealer in Boston, Massachusetts. Later in 1929, Vose resold it to Boston-based collector Robert Treat Paine II for $125,000. He loaned it to the Museum of Fine Arts in Boston from January 1930 to 1944. When Paine II died in 194,3 he left it to his son Richard Cushing Paine and it remained in the Paine family collection until 1986 and was on display in the Museum of Fine Arts for 20 years. 

On 10 December 1986, the portrait was sold at Sotheby's in London to an anonymous buyer, who in 2007 put it on loan to the J. Paul Getty Museum in Los Angeles. It is now in the permanent collection of Allentown Art Museum in Allentown, Pennsylvania.

External links
"Portait of a Young Woman" at Allentown Art Museum
Tax Law Rushes Rembrandt Sale
Robert C. Vose’s Favorite Story: Travels of a Lady

1632 paintings
Young Woman